Parkyns is a surname. People with this surname include:

 Sir William Parkyns or Perkins ( – 1696), English lawyer and Jacobite conspirator, executed for high treason
Colonel Isham Parkyns, a royalist officer during the English Civil War known for his defence of Ashby-de-la-Zouch against Cromwell's forces, and father of the first of the Parkyns baronets of Bunny Hall in  Nottinghamshire, including:
Sir Thomas Parkyns, 2nd Baronet (1664–1741), writer on wrestling
 two barons in the peerage of Ireland, both of whom were Members of Parliament:
Thomas Parkyns, 1st Baron Rancliffe (1755–1800)
George Parkyns, 2nd Baron Rancliffe (1785–1850)
 Mansfield Parkyns (1823–1894), grandson of the 3rd baronet, English traveller, known for his travel book Life in Abyssinia

See also 
Parkyn